Bloodlands is a 2017 Albanian horror film directed and written by Steven Kastrissios.

Plot

A struggling family in mountainous northern Albania wrestling with tradition, must unite against a mysterious clan aggression.

Cast
 Gëzim Rudi as Skender
 Suela Bako as Shpresa
 Emiljano Palali as Artan
 Alesia Xhemalaj as Iliriana
 Ilire Vinca Çelaj as Drita
 Dritan Arbana as Florian
 Florist Bajgora as Erald
 Andi Begolli as Leo
 Enxhi Cuku as Lorena
 Fioralba Kryemadhi as Vlora
 Edvin Mustafa as Bako
 Rina Narazani as Town Clerk
 Ermal Sadiku as Olek

References

External links
 

2017 films
2017 horror films
Albanian drama films
Albanian-language films
2010s supernatural horror films
Films about witchcraft
Films about revenge